The following railroads operate in the U.S. state of Montana.

Common freight carriers
 BNSF Railway (BNSF)
 Butte, Anaconda and Pacific Railway (BAP)
 Central Montana Rail, Inc.  (CM)
 Dakota, Missouri Valley and Western Railroad (DMVW)
 Mission Mountain Railroad (MMT)
 Montana Rail Link (MRL)
 Union Pacific Railroad (UP)
 Yellowstone Valley Railroad (YSVR)

Private freight carriers
 Global Rail Group
 Lincoln County Port Authority (LCPA)
 Montana Limestone Company (MLC)
 Port of Montana (POM)
 Transco

Passenger carriers
 Amtrak (AMTK)

Defunct railroads

Electric
 Amador Railway
 Anaconda Copper Mining Company (Electric Light and Railway Department)
 Bozeman Street Railway
 Butte, Anaconda and Pacific Railway (BA&P, BAP)
 Butte Consolidated Railway
 Butte Electric Railway
 Gallatin Light, Power and Railway Company
 Gallatin Valley Railway
 Gallatin Valley Electric Railway
 Great Falls Street Railway
 Helena Light and Railway Company
 Helena Light and Traction Company

Not completed
 Montana Railway
 North and South Railway

Notes

References

 Association of American Railroads (2003), . Retrieved May 11, 2005.
 

Montana
 
 
Railroads